Bogdaniec   is a village in Gorzów County, Lubusz Voivodeship, in western Poland. It is the seat of the gmina (administrative district) called Gmina Bogdaniec.

The village has a population of 1,100.

References

Bogdaniec